The 2020–21 Eintracht Braunschweig season is the club's 127th season in existence and its first season back in the second flight of German football. In addition to the domestic league, Eintracht Braunschweig participated in this season's edition of the DFB-Pokal. The season covers the period from 1 July 2020 to 30 June 2021.

Players

First-team squad

Transfers

In

Out

Pre-season and friendlies

Competitions

Overview

2. Bundesliga

League table

Results summary

Results by round

Matches
The league fixtures were announced on 7 August 2020.

DFB-Pokal

Statistics

Goalscorers

Notes

References

External links

Eintracht Braunschweig seasons
Eintracht Braunschweig